Transition Training Squadron Atlantic was a United States Navy training squadron in World War II. It was established on 28 July 1941 upon redesigned of the Operational Training Squadron of the Atlantic Fleet. It was stationed at Naval Air Station Norfolk, Virginia, with one detachment at Naval Air Station Banana River, Florida and one detachment at Glenn L. Martin Company, Middle River, Maryland. It fell under the Commander, Naval Air Force U.S. Atlantic Fleet.

The mission of the squadron was "to give advanced patrol plane training to newly graduated naval aviators, fresh from training centers, prior to assignment to Patrol plane units in the fleets."

References

Military in Brevard County, Florida
Military in Norfolk, Virginia
Military units and formations in Florida
Military units and formations in Virginia
Military units and formations of the United States Navy in World War II
Training squadrons of the United States Navy